The Sõtke is a  long river in Ida-Viru County, Estonia. Its source is near Isandajärv which is located in the northern part of the Kurtna Lake District. The Sõtke flows into the Gulf of Finland in the town of Sillamäe. The basin area of the Pirita is 93.7 km2

References

Rivers of Estonia
Landforms of Ida-Viru County